Bahri is a masculine Arabic given name.

Given name
 Huseyin Bahri Alptekin (1957-2007), Turkish artist
 Bahri Tanrıkulu (born 1980), Turkish taekwondo athlete

Surname
 Ahmed Al-Bahri (born 1980), Saudi Arabian footballer
 Hardev Bahri (1907–2000), Indian linguist
 Mamdouh Bahri (born 1957), Tunisian musician
 Nasser al-Bahri (1972–2015), Yemeni al-Qaeda member
 Vicky Bahri, Indian filmmaker

See also
 Bahri dynasty
 Bahri (company)
 Bahri (horse), thoroughbred racehorse
 Khartoum North

Arabic-language surnames
Arabic masculine given names
Indian surnames
Pakistani names
Turkish masculine given names
Surnames of Indian origin
Punjabi-language surnames
Hindu surnames
Khatri clans
Khatri surnames